Adham Ahmed Saleh (born June 27, 1993) is an Egyptian Greco-Roman wrestler. He competed at the 2016 Summer Olympics in the men's Greco-Roman 66 kg event, in which he was eliminated in the repechage by Ryu Han-su.

References

External links
 

1993 births
Living people
Egyptian male sport wrestlers
Olympic wrestlers of Egypt
Wrestlers at the 2016 Summer Olympics
21st-century Egyptian people